Boiled Angel was an early 1990s independent comic book created by Florida-based underground comic book artist Mike Diana. The comic contained graphic depictions of a variety of taboo and gory subject matters. It effectively became the first comic book in the United States to cause its creator to be convicted for artistic obscenity.

In a 1990 review, Mike Gunderloy of Factsheet Five called Boiled Angel "a prime candidate for banning in the 90s." In 1993, a copy of Boiled Angel #8 (or "Ate") found its way into the hands of Florida Assistant State's Attorney Stuart Baggish. Diana was subsequently charged with several counts of obscenity and fought a long legal battle with the aid of the Comic Book Legal Defense Fund, which he eventually lost. He was sentenced to community service and three years of supervised probation.

References 

Censorship in the United States
American comics
1990 comics debuts
1990 comics endings
Censored comics
Comics controversies
Underground comix
Erotic comics
Humor comics
Comics critical of religion
Obscenity controversies in comics